West Washington Street Bridge may refer to:

West Washington Street Bridge (Springfield, Illinois), listed on the National Register of Historic Places in Sangamon County, Illinois
West Washington Street Bridge (Muncie, Indiana), listed on the National Register of Historic Places in Delaware County, Indiana